Clivina australasiae is a species of ground beetle in the subfamily Scaritinae. It was described by Boheman in 1858.

References

australasiae
Beetles described in 1858
Beetles of New Zealand
Beetles of Australia